Laulii is a village on the eastern side of Tutuila Island in American Samoa. It is located in Sua County. Entering the village of Laulii, one has to climb a small hill where a lighthouse is located. The village's rugby club is named after the lighthouse — Moli ole Ava. It is one of the most successful and oldest clubs in the territory. Many well-known players have emerged from Laulii, such as Vui Eli Tagaloa, the current coach, Ropeti Taula, and others. The village is divided into two sections: Lauliituai (Old Town) and Lauliifou (New Laulii).As of Late 2020 there are 6 Christian Worship Churches in Laulii. The Methodist, The Catholic, The London Missionary Society, Church, Assembly of God, Church of Christ  Latter Day Saints Laulii Ward, Saint John's Episcopal Church.     Breakers Point Naval Guns, which is listed on the U.S. National Register of Historic Places is located at Tafananai near Lauliifou. 

Laulii had a population of 892 residents as of the 2010 U.S. Census, down from 937 residents recorded in 2000.

History
In 1901, a meeting was held at Laulii in the honor of Benjamin Franklin Tilley, where Mrs. Tilley had the distinction of turning the first sod of the road planned to connect Laulii with Fagaitua. The road received the name William McKinley Memorial Road.

On May 6, 2018, a new Church of Jesus Christ of Latter-day Saints congregation was established in Laulii. Prior to its formation, LDS church members joined with fellow LDS members in Auto to worship.

References

Villages in American Samoa
Tutuila